is a railway station in the town of Tateyama, Toyama, Japan, operated by the private railway operator Toyama Chihō Railway.

Lines

Station layout 

The station has two ground-level opposed side platforms connected by a level crossing. The station is staffed.

History
Gohyakkoku Station was opened on 25 June 1913. On 1 January 1959 it was renamed , but was renamed back to its original name on 1 July 1970. A new station building, which includes the town library, opened in 2012.

Adjacent stations

Passenger statistics
In fiscal 2015, the station was used by 872 passengers daily.

Surrounding area 
Tateyama Town Hall
tateyama Post Office

See also
 List of railway stations in Japan

References

External links

 

Railway stations in Toyama Prefecture
Railway stations in Japan opened in 1913
Stations of Toyama Chihō Railway
Tateyama, Toyama